The discography of South Korean girl group Brave Girls consists of six extended plays (one of which was reissued under a different title), one single album, and thirteen singles (including two as featured artists).

Extended plays

Reissues

Single albums

Singles

As lead artist

As featured artist

Promotional singles

Compilation appearances

Other charted songs

Videography

Music videos

Notes

References

Discographies of South Korean artists
Discography
K-pop music group discographies